Zhantievus lymantriae is a species of beetle in the family Dermestidae, the only species in the genus Zhantievus.

References

Dermestidae